Hole in the Sky was a Norwegian extreme metal festival held in Bergen that took place at the end of August each year from 2000 to 2011. The first event was held in 2000 in honor of the then recently deceased Erik "Grim" Brødreskift, ex-member of Borknagar, Gorgoroth and Immortal. The festival was named after the eponymous song by Black Sabbath.

The last edition of the festival took place in August 2011.

See also
 Inferno Metal Festival
 Beyond the Gates
 Midgardsblot

References

External links
 (archived)

Heavy metal festivals in Norway
Music festivals in Norway
Festivals in Bergen
Music in Bergen
Music festivals established in 2000